The retribution principle (often abbreviated RP) is a term used in Ancient Near East studies and Old Testament studies to refer to various forms of the belief that the righteous will prosper while the wicked will suffer.

References

Religion and society